Varadhan is a surname. Notable people with the surname include:

Polur Varadhan (1952–2011), Indian politician
S. R. Srinivasa Varadhan (born 1940), Indian American mathematician
Varadhan's lemma

Indian surnames